Henkle Peak is a peak about  north of Mount Rex in Palmer Land, Antarctica. It lies among a group of nunataks that were first sighted and photographed by Lincoln Ellsworth on November 23, 1935. The peak was mapped by the United States Geological Survey (USGS) from surveys and U.S. Navy air photos, 1961–66, and was named by the Advisory Committee on Antarctic Names for Charles R. Henkle of USGS, a topographic engineer with the Marie Byrd Land Survey Party, 1967–68.

References

Mountains of Palmer Land